Nelogi  is a village in the southern state of Karnataka, India, It is located in the Jevargi taluk of Kalaburagi district in Karnataka, India,  Nelogi is the famous for Sri Hanuman temple Every year  Hanuman Jayanthi and Ashada chaturthi are celebrated very well in this temple. Nelogi is the birthplace of sri neelakanthappa sahu devaramani ex MLA jewargi afterwords CM Dharmasingh , Few Rajput people are staying in Nelogi and their culture belongs to Rajasthan. Shri Kalyan Singh Thakur is Famous person and social worker, He having long mustache and wearing always petha.

Demographics
 India census, Nelogi had a population of 5169 with 2708 males and 2461 females.

See also
 Gulbarga
 Districts of Karnataka

References

External links
 http://Gulbarga.nic.in/

Villages in Kalaburagi district